The 2022 Wisconsin Attorney General election took place on November 8, 2022, to elect the Attorney General of Wisconsin. Incumbent Democratic Attorney General Josh Kaul won re-election to a second term. Party nominees were selected in a partisan primary on August 9, 2022.

Democratic primary

Candidates

Nominee
Josh Kaul, incumbent attorney general

Endorsements

Results

Republican primary

Candidates

Nominee
Eric Toney, Fond du Lac County prosecutor

Eliminated in primary
Adam Jarchow, former member of the Wisconsin State Assembly (2015–2019)
Karen Mueller, attorney and candidate for Wisconsin's 3rd congressional district in 2014

Withdrew
Ryan Owens, University of Wisconsin–Madison law professor (endorsed Jarchow)

Declined
Jake Curtis, attorney and Wisconsin Air National Guard first lieutenant (endorsed Jarchow)

Endorsements

Debate
A debate was held on July 20.

Results

General election

Debate
A debate was held on October 27.

Predictions

Polling

Results

See also
Wisconsin Attorney General

References

Notes

External links
Official campaign websites
Josh Kaul (D) for Attorney General
Eric Toney (R) for Attorney General

Attorney General
Wisconsin
Wisconsin Attorney General elections